.ua is the Internet country code top-level domain (ccTLD) for Ukraine. To register at the second-level (example) domainname.ua, possession of the exact trademark (matching the domain name) is required. It is not required for third-level domains (.com.ua, .net.ua, etc.).

Lo:.ua

History
 : Registered in root zone
 : DNSSEC enabled in root zone
 : Domain servers transferred out of Kyiv for continuity reasons amid the 2022 Russian invasion of Ukraine

Statistics 
As of March 2017, around 10.78% of all the .ua domains were served via secured HTTPS protocol, with the Let's Encrypt Authority X3 being the most popular SSL certificate. Nginx is the most popular web server, serving 68.97% of the .ua domains, followed by Apache serving 17.75% of the total .ua domains.

Third-level domains

To remove the risk of cyber squatting, registration of second-level domains directly below .ua is restricted to owners of registered trade marks, who may register a domain name similar to that of the trade mark in question. However, third-level domains can be registered beneath some of the following:

 .com.ua: paid, commercial organizations
 .edu.ua: free, available only to proved educational organisations.
 .gov.ua: free, available only to governmental organizations
 .net.ua:  paid, network service providers
 .in.ua:  paid, domains for individuals
 .org.ua: paid, other organizations (non-commercial)

Second-level domains

There are also second-level domains which are region-specific. These are less popular than the above list (making domain names more available) but they are sometimes restricted to organisations exclusively from within the region.
 
 .cherkasy.ua, .cherkassy.ua (also: ck.ua): Cherkasy Oblast
 .chernigov.ua (.cn.ua): Chernihiv Oblast
 .chernivtsi.ua, .chernovtsy.ua (cv.ua): Chernivtsi Oblast
 .crimea.ua (.cr.ua): Crimea
 .dnipropetrovsk.ua, .dnepropetrovsk.ua (.dp.ua): Dnipropetrovsk Oblast
 .donetsk.ua (.dn.ua): Donetsk Oblast
 .ivano-frankivsk.ua (.if.ua): Ivano-Frankivsk Oblast
 .kharkiv.ua, .kharkov.ua (.kh.ua): Kharkiv Oblast
 .kherson.ua (.ks.ua): Kherson Oblast
 .khmelnitskiy.ua (.km.ua): Khmelnytskyi Oblast
 .kirovograd.ua (.kr.ua): Kirovohrad Oblast
 .kyiv.ua, .kiev.ua (.kv.ua): Kyiv
 .lugansk.ua (.lg.ua): Luhansk Oblast
 .lutsk.ua, .volyn.ua (.vl.ua): Lutsk, Volyn Oblast
 .lviv.ua (.lv.ua): Lviv Oblast
 .nikolaev.ua (.mk.ua): Mykolaiv Oblast
 .odesa.ua, .odessa.ua (.od.ua): Odessa Oblast
 .poltava.ua (.pl.ua): Poltava Oblast
 .rivne.ua, .rovno.ua (.rv.ua): Rivne Oblast
 .sevastopol.ua: Sevastopol
 .sumy.ua (.sm.ua)- Sumy Oblast
 .ternopil.ua (.te.ua): Ternopil Oblast
 .uzhgorod.ua (.uz.ua): Uzhhorod, Zakarpattia Oblast
 .vinnica.ua (.vn.ua): Vinnytsia Oblast
 .yalta.ua: Yalta
 .zaporizhzhe.ua (.zp.ua): Zaporizhzhia Oblast
 .zhitomir.ua (.zt.ua): Zhytomyr Oblast

See also
 .укр, a second top domain for Ukraine, active from 2013, which has domains with Cyrillic characters.
 Internet in Ukraine

References

External links
 IANA .ua whois information
 Official site of domain .ua
 Official site of .ua registry
 Statistic of domain names usage
 Ukrainian Domains Statistics and Information
 Public Suffix List

Computer-related introductions in 1992
Council of European National Top Level Domain Registries members
Country code top-level domains
Internet in Ukraine

sv:Toppdomän#U